Churchill Insurance is a British insurance company based in Bromley, London. Founded in 1989, as one of the country's first direct to customer car insurance companies, the company has expanded to offer a range of general insurance products. Since February 2012, Churchill is part of the Direct Line Group; policies are underwritten by the parent United Kingdom Insurance Limited.

Churchill is notable for its advertising that features a talking nodding dog mascot.

History
Churchill Insurance was launched by founder Martin Long in June 1989, as a direct car insurance provider. Long was backed by Winterthur, at that time a Credit Suisse subsidiary. Home insurance was added to the Churchill product range a year later. In 1994, the company began to use a bulldog as its mascot.

In 1995, Churchill launched its first website, and a credit card. It also became the first United Kingdom insurer to offer motor insurance estimates via interactive media kiosks.

In 1996, Churchill achieved accreditation with Investors in People and ISO9002. The same year, the nodding dog was introduced to its advertising and breakdown cover was added to the product range. The dog mascot is named Winston Churchill, after the former Prime Minister of the same name.

In 1997, Churchill Insurance was named in Britain's Best Employers for the first time, the year the company relocated to its current headquarters, Churchill Court. Travel insurance and pet insurance products were introduced. In October 1999, motorcycle insurance broker Devitt Insurance was acquired. The company also launched its first e commerce facility, enabling online car and home insurance quotes.

In 2000, it acquired the Churchill.com domain name for online activity, and acquired NIG in February 2000, after announcing their intentions to acquire it in December 1999.

In February 2002, Churchill bought Prudential's insurance business. In June 2003, the business was purchased by the Royal Bank of Scotland Group for £1.1 billion. This brought Churchill into RBS' insurance division alongside Direct Line – another company Long had been involved in launching.

Following the bailout of RBS by the Government of the United Kingdom in 2008, the European Union demanded that certain group assets be sold off, including the insurance division. In February 2012, Churchill became part of the new Direct Line Group, which was created ahead of a divestment that was completed in February 2014.

Services
Churchill offers a range of general insurance products, underwritten by United Kingdom Insurance: car, home, pet and travel insurance and breakdown cover, in association with Green Flag. They also offer life insurance in association with Legal & General and motorbike insurance, arranged through Devitt Insurance Brokers. One commercial product is available through Churchill: van insurance, arranged and administered by Brightside Insurance Services.

Awards
Churchill has won numerous Your Money Awards for its products:
 Best Online Home and Contents Insurance Provider – 2000, 2004, 2007
 Best Motor Insurance Provider – 2000, 2001, 2002, 2003, 2006 (joint winner with Direct Line), 2008
 Best Online Motor Insurance Provider – 2000, 2001, 2002, 2003, 2006, 2007
 Best Travel Insurance Provider – 2001
 Best Online Pet Insurance Provider – 2004, 2009, 2010
 Best Home and Contents Insurance Provider – 2005, 2008
 Best Pet Insurance Provider – 2008

Marketing

Sponsorships
In October 1993, Churchill signed a three year deal to sponsor the World Indoor Bowls Championship.

In August 2000, Churchill became the shirt sponsor of Crystal Palace FC, the football team Martin Long supported and would eventually share the chairmanship of.

Advertising

In 1994, it was decided that the company needed a mascot to represent the Churchill brand, and differentiate it from the former British Prime Minister, Winston Churchill. A staff competition led to the adoption of a bulldog, a well known symbol of British identity. The first Churchill dog was a real bulldog called Lucas. The company first used a nodding dog in 1996. Churchill began selling nodding dog models in 1997.

In the company's television advertising, the computer-animated Churchill dog was asked whether he could save people money on their insurance and he responded with his catchphrase: "Oh, yes!" The catchphrase is believed to be an impersonation of Potter the Janitor (played by Deryck Guyler) from the television series of the 1970s, Please Sir!.
Churchill was voiced by Bob Mortimer. Older adverts had Mortimer's voice responding to questions posed by his comedy partner Vic Reeves. In April 2005, however, Reeves was removed from the adverts, after he was convicted of drink-driving. More adverts were launched featuring the Churchill dog, alongside celebrities including Melanie Sykes and Roy Walker. Walker began starring in the adverts in January 2009. 

In 2004, a hot air balloon of Churchill was unveiled, and was the United Kingdom's largest special shaped hot air balloon, measuring 34 metres wide by 24 metres high. The balloon appears at numerous events across the country, notably the Bristol International Balloon Fiesta and the London Marathon. In 2006, a high profile "Challenge Churchill" campaign was launched, involving the people of Britain challenging the brand mascot to find them cheaper car and home insurance. In 2009, the company adopted a new strapline: "Count on Churchill". Bob Mortimer continued to provide the voice for the dog until at least January 2009.

In recent years, talking soft toys have been added to the range of Churchill merchandise, and the character has a page on social networking site Facebook.

During 2009, Churchill starred in twenty two pantomimes around the United Kingdom. In August 2010, he made appearances at Pontins holiday camps, before returning for his second pantomime run. Martin Clunes featured in Churchill's television campaigns until November 2012, when he was removed after being banned from driving. Clunes was replaced by Dawn French in the firm's television adverts in February 2013.

An advert, in May 2013, featured Churchill riding on a kids' ride, with Gary Numan's song "Cars" playing in the background.

Churchill was once again redesigned in October 2019, where his long serving nodding dog design was changed, to a new, CGI version.

Controversy
In January 2012, Churchill, along with sister company Direct Line, was fined £2.17m by the Financial Services Authority after being found guilty of altering complaints files.

In February 2013, Churchill received media attention after it appealed a High Court of Justice judgement in the case of Bethany Probert, who, in 2009 when she was 13 years old, was hit by a car driven by one of the insurer's customers whilst walking along a country lane. The company eventually paid 90% of the claim. Mrs Twyman, 51, said: "Before the accident, Bethany was just a normal teenager. She was a very bright kid A* student - who loved being outside. Since the crash, Bethany has suffered numerous problems, including memory loss, balance problems, and seizures. She uses a wheelchair some of the time.

References

External links

1989 establishments in England
2003 mergers and acquisitions
British companies established in 1989
Companies based in the London Borough of Bromley
Direct Line Group
Financial services companies established in 1989
Insurance companies of the United Kingdom
Royal Bank of Scotland
Vehicle insurance